Steve Benjamin may refer to:

 Steve Benjamin (sailor) (born 1955), American Olympic medalist in men's sailing
 Stephen K. Benjamin (born 1969), American politician